Queen Inseon (Hangul: 인선왕후 장씨, Hanja: 仁宣王后 張氏; 9 February 1619 – 19 March 1674), of the Deoksu Jang clan, was a posthumous name bestowed to the wife and queen consort of Yi Ho, King Hyojong. She was queen consort of Joseon from 1649 until her husband's death in 1659, after which she was honoured as Queen Dowager Hyosuk (효숙왕대비). She was the first Joseon queen consort with the experience of living in a foreign country.

Biography

Early life
The future queen was born on 9 February 1619 during the 11th year of reign of King Gwanghae. Her father, Jang Yu, was member of the Deoksu Jang clan. Her mother was a member of the Andong Kim clan. Through her mother, Lady Jang is also a grandniece of Kim Jang-saeng making her be distantly related to Queen Ingyeong, her grandson’s wife, who is also the great-great-granddaughter of Kim Jang-saeng. 

Imperial Consort Gwi-in of the Deoksu Jang clan was a descendant from her father. She became a concubine of King Gojong, the last king of the Joseon Dynasty, and was the mother of Yi Kang, Prince Imperial Ui.

It's said that she was courteous, had a gentle character, and had an adorable body form with chubby cheeks.

In 1630, when she was 12 years old, King Injo personally appointed the spouse of his second son, Yi Ho, Grand Prince Bongrim. Injo decided choose Jang Yu's daughter as his son's wife as he regarded her as wise and virtuous. The following year, she was bestowed with the title Princess Consort Pungan (풍안부부인, Pungan Bubuin), after an auspicious ceremony with Grand Prince Boram. 

After entering the palace, Pungan was careful with her conduct every time of the day, and as she served and respected elders in a consistent manner, she received special love from her mother-in-law, Queen Inryeol. Four years later, she left the palace with her husband and lived in a private residence. At this point, she displayed her prudence through wisely taking care of house chores and handling all sorts of matters at home.

Qing Invasion

When the Qing invasion of Joseon had occurred in 1636, Pungan fled to Gwangha Island along with Bongrim, her husband's sister-in-law, the Crown Princess Consort Kang, and her maternal grandfather, Kim Sang-yong, the Third State Councillor. Afterward, when the Qing dynasty's troops hand landed directly on Gwanghado Island, endangering the lives of many people, while everyone cried out with confusion, Pungan showed calmness and handled the crisis composedly as usual.

When the enemy had landed at Gwanghado Island and captured the castle, Kim Sang-yong set fire to gunpowder and self-destructed with his enemies. After his death, he was promoted as Yeonguijeong. However, Joseon suffered the defeat known as the "Humiliation at Samjeondo" during the Qing invasion in the end. As a result, Bongrim and his older brother, Crown Prince Sohyeon, were taken to Shenyang of the Qing dynasty as hostages. At this moment, Pungan also followed Bongrim to the Qing dynasty. She supported her husband by doing all sorts of difficult tasks for eight years, and she gave birth to 3 daughters and two sons there; one of them being her only son to reach adulthood, Yi Yeon.

Years later, although the Crown Prince was released and returned home, he died a mysterious death suspected of poisoning. When Bongrim returned from the Qing in 1645, he was appointed as the crown prince, making Pungan automatically the crown princess consort. Because of Crown Princess Kang, widow of the late Crown Prince Sohyeon, who was the most enlightened royal woman in Joseon history, was sentenced to death by King Injo. As the next crown princess, she had no choice but to use the former crown princess' death as a lesson to be learned.

Life as queen consort
After Injo died in 1649, Crown Prince Bongrim ascended to the throne as 17th Joseon monarch (temple name: Hyojong), making the Crown Princess Consort automatically the queen consort. As the head of royal consorts, she wisely led court ladies and treated her subordinates with kindness while being stern yet merciful.

For example, one of the King's concubine, Royal Noble Consort An of the Gyeongju Yi clan, caused a great stir after calling her daughter, Princess Suknyeong, "you". At that time, it was customary for royal concubines to avoid using informal speech to the king's children, even if she was their biological mother since princes and princesses of blood were in higher rank than a royal concubine. When this became known, the King tried to punish Yi An-bin, but the Queen adamantly persuaded the King to let it pass. In this manner, she truly cared for her subordinates.

However, in the Queen's epitaph, written in the Veritable Records of the Joseon Dynasty, it's recorded that she said, "If a wife regards highly of herself, since such an attitude rarely doesn't cause harm to one's home or country, hens should not cry at dawn." It also says one should take strict precautions about it. But as a witness to Crown Princess Kang's tragic death, such a way of thinking may have been the best strategy for her to rely on during the complicated political situation of the time.

The Queen exchanged written letters with her daughters who were married and among them, 70 copies of letters in Korean, sent between the Queen to Princess Sukshin and Princess Sukmyeong, are available currently. The Queen also cherished Princess Suknyeong, Yi An-bin's daughter and the only child of Hyojong from his royal concubine, without discrimination. For instance, there was occasion in which the King and the Queen were giving gifts to their children, and when the King gave gifts only to the princesses while being conscious of how the Queen would react without giving any present to the concubine's daughter, the Queen, who was worried about this, called Princess Suknyeong personally with a gift.

Furthermore, as the Queen also advocated the expedition to conquer the north as much as Hyojong, during her tenure as queen consort, she eradicated exorcism (known as Gutpan) and prohibited drinking. By unifying the color of blankets into two colors, red and blue, she also prepared them to be used as military uniform in case of a war and all of these prepared finances were used for conquering the north.

Life as queen dowager and later life
In 1659, as the King was receiving acupuncture to treat a boil on his head, he ended up losing too much blood during the process, making his condition critical, and eventually died in vain due to medical accident. On this, even though the Queen expressed her sorrow through severe wailing, she gave her best to make the funeral process meaningful, and it's told that she personally trimmed his fingernails as well as toenails and washed his body. After that, she only ate a thin rice gruel for 3 months.

Yi Yeon succeeded his father as 18th Joseon monarch (temple name: Hyeonjong) and she was honoured as Queen Dowager Hyosuk (효숙왕대비). However, she became ill because she failed to take care of her health after her husband's death. Afterwards, Hyosuk frequently went to Onyang and took a bath in a hot spring, showing a slight improvement in her health condition, but when she reached 56 years old in 1674, her illness suddenly aggravated and she died in Gyeongdeok Palace's (known at the time as Gyeonghui Palace), Hoesang Hall. Her tomb is in Yeongneung, located in Wangdae-ri, Neungseo-myeon, Yeoju-si, Gyeonggi-do, and is buried together with her husband in the Dongwonsanghareung cluster (the king's tomb lies in line with that of his wife). For her posthumous title, “In” (인, 仁) was for showing love and loyalty, and “Seon” (선, 宣) was for spreading goodness around and to others. Thus, she was posthumously honoured as Queen Inseon. 

When Queen Inseon passed away, and because Injo's second consort, who was also her six years younger mother-in-law, Queen Dowager Jaui, was present, the problem was known as "Yesong Dispute", which had become an issue after Hyojong's death, cropped up again. This triggered the second Yesong Dispute in Joseon.

Family

Parent

 Great-Great-Great-Grandfather 
 Jang Ok (장옥, 張玉)
 Great-Great-Grandfather 
 Jang Ja-jong (장자중, 張自重)
 Great-Grandfather
 Jang Il (장일, 張逸)
 Grandfather
 Jang Un-ik (1561 – 1599) (장운익, 張雲翼)
 Grandmother 
 Lady Park of the Miryang Park clan (? – 1632) (밀양 박씨)
 Father 
 Jang Yu (22 January 1587 – 30 April 1638) (장유, 張維)
 Uncle - Jang Shin (장신, 張紳) (? - 1637)
 Mother 
 Internal Princess Consort Yeongga of the Andong Kim clan (영가부부인 안동 김씨, 永嘉府夫人 安東 金氏) (? - 19 January 1654)
 Grandfather − Kim Sang-yong (김상용, 金尙容) (1561 - 22 January 1637)
 Grandmother - Lady Kim of the Gwangsan Kim clan (광산 김씨)

Siblings
 Older sister - Lady Jang of the Deoksu Jang clan (덕수 장씨, 德水 張氏)
 Younger brother - Jang Seon-jing (장선징, 張善澂)
 Nephew - Jang Hwan (장훤, 張楦)
 Niece - Lady Jang of the Deoksu Jang clan (덕수 장씨, 德水 張氏)
 Nephew-in-law - Kim Jin-seo (김진서, 金鎭瑞) (1663 - 1712)

Consort

 Husband − Yi Ho, King Hyojong (3 July 1619 – 23 June 1659) (조선 효종)
 Mother-in-law - Queen Inryeol of the Cheongju Han clan (16 August 1594 – 16 January 1636) (인렬왕후 한씨)
 Mother-in-law - Queen Jangryeol of the Yangju Jo clan (16 December 1624 – 20 September 1688) (장렬왕후 조씨)
 Father-in-law - Yi Jong, King Injo (7 December 1595 – 17 June 1649) (조선 인조)

Issue

 Daughter − Princess Sukshin (1635 – 1637) (숙신공주)
 Adoptive daughter − Yi Ae-suk, Princess Uisun (1635 – 1662) (이애숙 의순공주, 李愛淑)
 Adoptive son-in-law − Prince Dorgon (17 November 1612 – 31 December 1650) (도르곤)
 Adoptive son-in-law − Prince Bolo (1613 – 23 April 1652) (보로)
 Daughter − Princess Sukan (1636 – 22 December 1697) (숙안공주)
 Son-in-law − Hong Deuk-gi (1635 – 1673) (홍득기, 洪得箕)
 Grandson - Hong Chi-sang (홍치상, 洪致祥) (1654 - 1689)
 Unnamed prince (? - 1642)
 Daughter − Princess Sukmyeong (1640 – 17 March 1699) (숙명공주)
 Son-in-law − Sim Ik-hyeon (심익현, 沈益顯)
 Grandson - Sim Jeong-bo (심정보, 沈廷輔) (1658 - ?)
 Grandson - Sim Jeong-hyeop (심정협, 沈廷協) 1659 - ?)
 Son − Yi Yeon, King Hyeonjong (14 March 1641 – 17 September 1674) (조선 현종)
Daughter-in-law − Queen Myeongseong of the Cheongpung Kim clan (13 June 1642 – 21 January 1684) (명성왕후 김씨)
 Unnamed granddaughter (1658 - 1658)
 Granddaughter − Princess Myeongseon (명선공주, 明善公主) (1659 - 12 September 1673)
 Grandson − Yi Sun, King Sukjong (숙종대왕, 肅宗大王) (7 October 1661 - 12 January 1720)
 Granddaughter − Princess Myeonghye (명혜공주, 明惠公主) (12 September 1663 - 11 June 1673)
 Granddaughter − Yi Eun-hee, Princess Myeongan (이온희 명안공주, 李溫姬 明安公主) (30 January 1665 - 16 May 1687)
 Daughter − Princess Sukhwi (1642 – 27 October 1696) (숙휘공주)
 Son-in-law − Jeong Je-hyeon (정제현, 鄭齊賢)
 Grandson - Jeong Tae-il (정태일, 鄭台一) (1661 - 1685)
 Unnamed prince (1645 - 1645)
 Daughter − Princess Sukjeong (1646 – 13 June 1668) (숙정공주)
 Son-in-law − Jeong Jae-ryun (1648 – 1723) (정재륜, 鄭載崙)
 Grandson - Jeong Hyo-seon (정효선, 鄭孝先) (1663 - 1680)
 Granddaughter - Lady Jeong of the Dongrae Jeong clan (동래 정씨, 東萊 鄭氏)
 Daughter − Princess Sukgyeong (1648 – 9 January 1671) (숙경공주) 
 Son-in-law − Won Mong-rin (1648 – 1674) (원몽린, 元夢麟)
 Granddaughter - Won Suk-hui (원숙희, 元淑喜) (1668 - ?)
 Adoptive grandson - Won Myeong-gu (원명구, 元命龜); son of Won Mong-ik (원몽익, 元夢翼)

In popular culture
Portrayed by Won Mi-kyung in the 1981 KBS1 TV Series Daemyeong.
 Portrayed by Kim Hye-sun in the 2012 MBC TV series The King's Doctor. 
 Portrayed by Lee Mun-jeong in the 2013 JTBC TV series Cruel Palace: War of Flowers.

Notes

External links
 
 

1619 births
1674 deaths
Royal consorts of the Joseon dynasty
Korean queens consort
Deoksu Jang clan
17th-century Korean women